Ischnolea crinita is a species of beetle in the family Cerambycidae. It was described by Thomson in 1860. It is known from Brazil and Ecuador.

References

Desmiphorini
Beetles described in 1860